Abrothrix lanosus, also known as the woolly grass mouse or woolly akodont, is a species of rodent in the family Cricetidae.
It is found in southern Argentina and Chile. It was previously classified in the genus Akodon rather than Abrothrix.

References

Literature cited
Musser, G.G. and Carleton, M.D. 2005. Superfamily Muroidea. Pp. 894–1531 in Wilson, D.E. and Reeder, D.M. (eds.). Mammal Species of the World: a taxonomic and geographic reference. 3rd ed. Baltimore: The Johns Hopkins University Press, 2 vols., 2142 pp. 
Pardinas, U. and D'Elia, G. 2008. . In IUCN. IUCN Red List of Threatened Species. Version 2009.2. <www.iucnredlist.org>. Downloaded on January 12, 2010.

Mammals of Argentina
Mammals of Chile
Abrothrix
Mammals described in 1897
Taxonomy articles created by Polbot